Carlos Douglas Shelden (June 10, 1840 – June 24, 1904) was a soldier and politician from the U.S. state of Michigan.

Shelden was born in Walworth, Wisconsin and moved with his parents to Houghton County, Michigan in 1847.  He attended the Union School of Ypsilanti, Michigan and returned to his home in the fall of 1861.  He served throughout the Civil War as captain in the Twenty-third Regiment, Michigan Volunteer Infantry.  
At the end of his service, Shelden returned to Houghton County and engaged in mining, machining, real estate, and the steamboat business.  Years later, he served in the Michigan House of Representatives from Houghton County 2nd District, 1893–94 and served in the Michigan Senate (32nd District) in 1894.

In 1896, Shelden was elected as a Republican from Michigan's 12th congressional district  to the 55th United States Congress. He was subsequently re-elected to the 56th and 57th Congresses, serving from March 4, 1897 to March 3, 1903 in the U.S. House.  He was an unsuccessful candidate for re-nomination in 1902, losing to fellow Republican H. Olin Young.

Carlos D. Shelden died just two weeks after his 64th birthday in Houghton, Michigan and is interred in Forest Hill Cemetery.

References

The Political Graveyard

External links

 

1840 births
1904 deaths
People from Walworth, Wisconsin
Republican Party members of the Michigan House of Representatives
Republican Party Michigan state senators
Republican Party members of the United States House of Representatives from Michigan
19th-century American politicians